Francesca Marie Smith (born March 26, 1985) is an American actress and writer, best known for voicing Helga Pataki on the Nickelodeon animated television series Hey Arnold!. She is also known for voicing multiple characters on Disney's Recess, most notably as Ashley B. and Swinger Girl, among others.

Filmography

Television

Films

Video games

Awards and nominations
In 1998, Smith won the award for Best Performance in a Voice-Over – TV or Film: Young Actress at the 19th Youth in Film Awards for her role on Hey Arnold! She was nominated for Best Youth Actress in a Voice-Over Role: TV or Movie at the 15th Youth in Film Awards for Itsy Bitsy Spider and for Best Performance in a TV Drama Series: Guest Starring Young Actress at the 18th Youth in Film Awards for her role on The Secret World of Alex Mack. In 2001, she was nominated for Best Performance in a Voice-Over: TV/Film/Video – Young Actress at the 22nd Young Artist Awards for her role on Hey Arnold!

Education
Smith studied at Pepperdine University, graduating in 2008 and obtained a Ph.D.from USC Annenberg in 2021.

References

External links

1985 births
American child actresses
American film actresses
Living people
American voice actresses
American television actresses
Actresses from Los Angeles
20th-century American actresses
21st-century American actresses
Pepperdine University alumni